Mahindra & Mahindra Financial Services Limited (MMFSL) is an Indian rural non-banking financial company headquartered in Mumbai. It is amongst the top tractor financers in India, with 1000+ offices across the country.

Mahindra Finance started on 1 January 1991, as Maxi Motors Financial Services Limited. They received the certificate of commencement of business on 19 February 1991. On 3 November 1992, Mahindra Finance changed their name to Mahindra & Mahindra Financial Services Limited. Mahindra Finance is registered with the Reserve Bank of India as an asset finance, deposit taking NBFC.

In 1993 it commenced financing M&M Utility vehicles and in 1995 started its first branch outside Mumbai, in Jaipur. The company began financing Non M&M vehicles in 2002 and got into the business of financing commercial vehicles and construction equipment in 2009. In 2011 they had a joint venture with Rabobank subsidiary for tractor financing in the US and consolidated the product portfolio by introducing small and medium enterprises (SME) financing.

Corporate affairs

As of November 2018, Ramesh Iyer is the Vice Chairman & President of Mahindra Financial Service Sector.

Products and services

Vehicle financing

Vehicle Financing: Auto and utility vehicles, tractors, cars, commercial vehicles and construction equipment.

Pre-owned vehicle financing: Loans for used cars, multi-utility vehicles, tractors and commercial vehicle.

SME financing

Loans for varied purposes like project finance, equipment finance and working capital finance.

Housing finance

Finances rural and semi-urban population to build houses.

Insurance broking

Insurance to retail customers as well as corporations through subsidiary Mahindra Insurance Brokers Limited

Asset management company (mutual fund)

Launched in June 2016, it offers mutual fund products, whose NAV is around 1000 INR. The MAMC started with an AUM of 1200 Million INR.

Mutual fund distribution

Advises clients on investing money under the brand Mahindra Finance Finsmart

Fixed deposits

Subsidiaries

Mahindra Mutual Fund

Mahindra Asset Management Company Private Limited is a wholly owned subsidiary of Mahindra and Mahindra Financial Services Limited (MMFSL).
Mahindra AMC Pvt Ltd, is the Investment Manager for Mahindra Mutual Fund. It started its operation in the first week of July 2016, with an AUM of 1200 Million INR and its NAV is floating around 1000 INR

Mahindra Mutual Fund endeavors to offer a variety of mutual fund schemes pan India, with special focus in rural and semi-urban areas.

Mahindra Insurance Brokers Limited

In FY 2012–13, the insurance broking subsidiary, Mahindra Insurance Brokers Limited (MIBL) crossed the 8,00,000 mark in terms of the policies served. The company's total policies, at the end of 2012–13, stood at 8,39,408 for both life and non-life retail business lines. It reached a total of Rs. 600 Crores gross premium. The income increased by 85 per cent from Rs. 46.6 Crores in 2011–12 to Rs. 86.3 Crores in 2012–13. 
During the year, MIBL entered into a strategic partnership with LeapFrog Investments, world's largest investor in insurance for the underserved. Through its subsidiary company, Inclusion Resources Private Limited, LeapFrog invested Rs. 80.4 Crores for a 15 per cent shareholding in MIBL. PayBima is the digital arm of Mahindra Insurance Brokers Ltd. and was launched to help customers compare and buy insurance policies online through their website.

Mahindra Rural Housing Finance Limited

In FY 2012–13, Mahindra Rural Housing Finance Limited (MRHFL) disbursed loans aggregating to Rs. 432.9 Crores, up from Rs. 266.8 Crores in the previous year. The profit after tax for 2012-13 stood at Rs. 222.3 Crores, against Rs. 11.9 Crores in the previous year. The outstanding loan portfolio, as on 31 March 2013, stood at Rs. 879.5 Crores.

Mahindra Business and Consulting Services Private Limited

Mahindra Finance's wholly owned subsidiary, Mahindra Business & Consulting Services Private Limited (MBCSPL), provides staffing services primarily to Mahindra Finance. It also serves the subsidiaries (MIBL and MRHFL) and parent company (Mahindra & Mahindra Limited). During the year, MBCSPL deputed 8,098 employees to these companies. The Profit after Tax increased from Rs. 7.1 Lacs in 2011–12 to Rs. 173.8 Lacs in 2012–13. and also turnover

References

Financial services companies of India
Mahindra Group
Financial services companies based in Mumbai
Financial services companies established in 1991
Indian companies established in 1991
1991 establishments in Maharashtra
Companies listed on the National Stock Exchange of India
Companies listed on the Bombay Stock Exchange